Goshen is a Canadian rural community in Guysborough County, Nova Scotia.

The community is approximately 30 km south of Antigonish, 30 km north of Sherbrooke and 30 km west of Guysborough on Route 316.

Its economy is tied to farming and forestry.

Demographics
Total Population - 395
Total Dwellings  - 214
Total Land Area  - 544.511 km2

Communications
The Postal Code is B0H 1M0  
The Telephone exchange is 902-783
Television - CBC Channel 2 - 9 kW
Television - CTV Channel 12 kW

References
Goshen on Destination Nova Scotia

Communities in Guysborough County, Nova Scotia
General Service Areas in Nova Scotia